Kelsey Scott Conover (born September 27, 1968 in Neptune Township, New Jersey) is a former professional football player.

Was in a 2007 NutriSystem for Men commercial and spoke the line: "Scott Conover, 100 pounds." The product had the tag line: "Pizza, pot roast, pasta: Real food for real guys."

A native of Freehold Borough, New Jersey, Scott graduated from Freehold High School and went on to attend and play football for Purdue University in Indiana. While at Purdue Scott was a defensive lineman for his first three seasons before being moved to offensive tackle.  After only one season on the offensive line he was drafted into the NFL in the fifth round.  He played six seasons in the NFL as offensive tackle for the Detroit Lions.

References

1968 births
Living people
American football offensive linemen
Detroit Lions players
Freehold High School alumni
Players of American football from New Jersey
Purdue Boilermakers football players
People from Freehold Borough, New Jersey
People from Neptune Township, New Jersey
Sportspeople from Monmouth County, New Jersey